Eufòria (Catalan for "Euphoria") is a Catalan music talent show. It premiered on March 3, 2022, on the television channel TV3. There are 16 participants and the final prize is a record contract, sing with Miki Núñez in the Summer Song from TV3, and participate in the album of La Marató de TV3.

Production 
Eufòria is produced by TV3 and the production company Veranda TV, with the collaboration of the Department of Culture of the Generalitat de Catalunya. The show is presented by actress and presenter Marta Torné and singer Miki Núñez. The judges of Eufòria are actors Elena Gadel and Marc Clotet and trap singer Lildami.

Auditions 
The audition process consisted of two parts: in the first one, 1,500 candidates participated and 90 of them were chosen for the second one (20 more than it was initially planned). The second part of the auditions happened in the span of three days and during these, the candidates were tested by the coaches. At the end of the first day, 40 participants remained, after the second day only 25 and on the third day, the 15 finalists were chosen (this was changed and on the first episode, there were 16 finalists).

Dynamic 
On TV3, every Friday airs a new episode, in which every singer has a solo song and also has to do the choir voices of other participants. These choir voices are analysed by what is called the "musical VAR", thanks to this, the musical director can nominate a singer who is not. On the other side, the coaches can rescue a participant who has been nominated by the musical director or by the judges. Although the judges can nominate as many contestants as they want, after the performances, the nomination by the musical director and the saves by the coaches, there can only be 2 contestants nominated. To save one, the public present on set votes and one of them will continue another week and the other will leave the talent show. Since the 6th gala, the audience from home can also vote for the contestant they want to eliminate. Starting in the second gala, the judges can make a singer the favourite, who sits on the chair. Although, the judges can make favourite another participant, meaning that the other one is beaten. At the end of the night, the singer sitting on the chair is the favourite, and for that, he cannot be nominated by the musical director and also gets the privilege of choosing who will do his choir voices in the next gala.

During the rest of the week, the singers are helped by the coaches: Jordi Cubino (musical director), Daniel Anglès (voice), Albert Sala and Aina Casanovas (choreography) and Carol Rovira (interpretation).

During the 6th gala, it was announced that the next one would be a rematch gala, in which one of the eliminated contestants would be able to coke back to the talent show. This decision will be up the public and audience, because the jury and coaches will be able to give their opinion but they won't be able to make any decision.

Weekly statistics 

Normal gala:‡: saved by the judges but nominated by the "musical VAR". the contestant is nominated but saved by the coaches. the contestant was nominated but saved by the public. the contestant was nominated and eliminated. the contestant has been on the chair at some point of the night. the contestant is the favourite of the night. the contestant cannot be eliminated. the contestant is a semifinalist. Winner Second finalist Third finalistRematch gala: the contestant is a candidate to come back to the program. the contestant comes back to the program. the contestant was between the four most voted in the rematch gala.

Performances

Solo performances

Performances in pairs 
For the eleventh gala, and first semifinal, it was announced that, apart from their solo performances, the contestants would have to sing in pairs.

References 

Catalan television programmes
2022 Spanish television series debuts
Spanish music television series
2020s music television series
2022 in Catalonia
2023 in Catalonia